The MCW Metrorider, launched at the 1986 Motor Show, was a minibus designed built by Metro Cammell Weymann (MCW) between 1986 and 1989. Constructed in two lengths, 7.0 m and 8.4 m, the Metrorider was an integral bus, marking it out from its van-based rivals of the time.

It was the second purpose-built minibus design (after the rather lightweight VW-based Optare CityPacer). MCW used beefy substantial components, the Perkins Phaser/ZF manual S5 driveline soon being outsold by the "optional" 115 bhp six-cylinder 5.9 litre Cummins B series engine driving through an Allison fully automatic gearbox. Some Metroriders also featured the optional turbocharged Cummins engine, increasing further their already impressive turn of speed. Disc brakes are fitted all round on the longer Metrorider, as opposed to drums on the short vehicles.

The styling was a major advance on the earlier van-based conversions, having a raked front with large windscreen and side windows to give a light interior. With shallower steps, wider entrance, and generous headroom, the passenger environment was certainly a great improvement on what had come before, with up to 25 (or 33 in the long version) seats comfortably accommodated. However, although the structure appeared to be of a heavyweight construction, long versions soon suffered weaknesses in the extended rear overhang and, in time, major corrosion set in, resulting in a life not quite as lengthy as might have initially been expected. The long-wheelbase version of the Metrorider measures 8.4m or 27' 6" in length, while the wide body was built to 2.375m or 7' 9½" wide, significantly broader than van conversions, allowing wider seats and/or gangway.

Like many MCW products, many components were from other manufacturers' stocks and the Metrorider used many parts from Ford. The dashboard and steering wheel came from a Ford Cargo lorry and the original rear lights were from the Escort Cabriolet Mk4.

The design suited one-person bus operation well and, despite the somewhat simplistic styling, the Metrorider sold in large numbers in the United Kingdom. Also, a number of Metroriders were exported new to Continental Europe and Hong Kong.

When MCW's parent group announced the closure of the company in 1989, MCW's current designs were offered for sale and the rights to the Metrorider were bought by Optare. The Optare MetroRider (as it was subtly re-branded) was subsequently re-launched and continued in production till 2000.

See also 

 List of buses

External links

Buses of the United Kingdom
Minibuses